Manuel Lombardoni (born 19 December 1998) is an Italian professional footballer who plays as a defender for  club Pro Patria.

Early career 
Manuel was born in Bergamo in 1998. He lives in Villa di Serio, in the province of Bergamo with his parents and his sister. He started playing in Villa di Serio's team at 5 years old. He had an experience with Brescia, up to Atalanta. With the Alzanocene he discovered his true role: central defender. In addition, he had the opportunity to train with the First Team and experience the benches in Serie A and in the Italian Cup.

Club career

Internazionale 
Lombardoni is a youth product of Inter youth sector. Before arriving in the youth sector of Inter he played for a year in Atalanta B.C. and then went to the Alzanocene (a league D team in Bergamo). The turning point was the change of role from midfielder to defender which took place during the Allievi championship. During last year in Alzanocene team he was captain and won the category championship. He made some appearances in the bench in the mid-season of the 2017–18 season both in Serie A and Coppa Italia, but he never appeared in the field. At Inter he played the first year in the Berretti team, winning the championship against Torino in the final. In addition, he made his debut at the Viareggio tournament with the Primavera coached by Stefano Vecchi. The following year he played for Inter's Primavera team and won the championship. During this season Manuel had groin pain and for this reason he did not take part in the final stages. During 2017–18 he won the league title, the super cup and reached the quarter-finals of the Youth League against Manchester City.

Loan to Pro Patria 
On 11 July 2018, Lombardoni was loaned to Serie C club Pro Patria on a season-long loan deal. Two months later, on 16 September, Lombardoni made his professional debut in Serie C for Pro Patria in a 2–1 home win over Pistoiese, he played the entire match. He became Aurora Pro Patria's first-choice in the first part of the season. On 9 December he was sent-off, for the first time in his professional career, with a double yellow card in the 62nd minute of a 1–1 home draw against Gozzano. In February he injured his shoulder while staying out of the fields to recover. Lombardoni ended his season-long loan to Aurora Pro Patria with 23 appearances, including 20 as a starter, and making 1 assist.

Pro Patria 
On 16 July 2019, Lombardoni returned to Serie C side Pro Patria on an undisclosed fee and he signed a 3-year contract. On 4 August, Lombardoni started his new season with the club with a 1–0 home win over Matelica in the first round of Coppa Italia, he played the entire match. Three weeks later, on 25 August, he scored his first professional goal in the fourth minute of a 2–1 home defeat against Monza.  He became Pro Patria's first-choice early in the season. On 23 October he played his first match as a substitute against Pontedera after 10 consecutive entire matches. On 15 December, Lombardoni scored his second goal for the club in the 84th minute of a 3–0 away win over Giana Erminio. Lombardoni ended his first season at the club with 27 appearances, including 26 of them as a starter. On 22 October he scored his third goal for the club in the 27th minute of a 3–0 home win over Lucchese.

Career statistics

Club

Honours

Club 
Inter Berretti
 Campionato Berretti: 2015–16

Inter Primavera
 Campionato Primavera 1: 2016–17, 2017–18
 Supercoppa Primavera: 2018
 Torneo Di Viareggio: 2018

References

External links 
 

1998 births
Living people
Footballers from Bergamo
Italian footballers
Association football defenders
Serie C players
Inter Milan players
Aurora Pro Patria 1919 players